Jill R Norfolk (born 15 February 1947) is a British former swimmer. She competed in two events at the 1964 Summer Olympics.

She also represented England in 110 yards and 220 yards backstroke, at the 1962 British Empire and Commonwealth Games in Perth, Western Australia.

During a Blackpool swim meet against Russia in April 1964 she broke the women's world record for the 110 yards backstroke in a time of 69.8 seconds.

References

1947 births
Living people
British female swimmers
Olympic swimmers of Great Britain
Swimmers at the 1964 Summer Olympics
Sportspeople from London
Swimmers at the 1962 British Empire and Commonwealth Games
Commonwealth Games competitors for England
20th-century British women